Stow may refer to:

Places

United Kingdom
 Stow, Lincolnshire or Stow-in-Lindsey, a village 
 Stow of Wedale or Stow, Scottish Borders, a village 
 Stow-on-the-Wold, Gloucestershire, a small town 
 Stow, Shropshire or Stowe, a village 
 Stow cum Quy, a parish near Cambridge
 Stow Bardolph, Norfolk, an estate and parish 
 Sturton by Stow, a village in Lincolnshire

Informally called "Stow"
 Stowmarket, a town in Suffolk 
 Walthamstow, an area in north east London

United States
 Stow, Maine
 Stow, Massachusetts
 Stow, New York
 Stow, Ohio

Other uses
 Stow (surname)
 Stow College, Glasgow, Scotland
 Stow Fair, Lincolnshire, a lost medieval fair
 Stow Abbey, an abbey in Lincolnshire, England
 Stow House, a U.S. historical landmark in Goleta, California
 Stow Lodge, a listed building in Stowmarket, Suffolk
 Walthamstow Stadium or The Stow, a former greyhound track in East London

See also
 Scotts of Stow, the flagship brand of Scotts & Co
 Stow Creek (disambiguation)
 Stowe (disambiguation)
 Stowers (disambiguation)